"Can't Feel My Face" is a song performed by Canadian singer the Weeknd from his second studio album Beauty Behind the Madness (2015). The song was released on June 8, 2015, as the third single from the album. It was written by Max Martin, Peter Svensson, Ali Payami, Savan Kotecha and the Weeknd, and produced by Martin and Payami.

Critics lauded "Can't Feel My Face", comparing the sound of the song to the works of Michael Jackson; Rolling Stone ranked it as the best song of 2015. It was also nominated for two Grammy Awards: Record of the Year and Best Pop Solo Performance. The song experienced commercial success, peaking at number one on both the US Billboard Hot 100 and the Canadian Hot 100. The single has also peaked at number one in Mexico, New Zealand, Denmark, Ireland and South Africa, and was a top 10 single in other territories, such as Australia, the Netherlands, Norway and the United Kingdom.

Background and composition
"Can't Feel My Face" leaked in late May 2015. It was officially released on June 8, 2015, following a performance by the Weeknd at Apple's Worldwide Developers Conference on the same day.

The song is composed in the key of A minor and has a tempo of 108 beats per minute. The vocal range spans from E3 to E5. Multiple sources have interpreted the song to be about cocaine, including a reference by the Weeknd himself in "Reminder": "I just won a new award for a kids show, Talking 'bout a face numbing off a bag of blow". Musically, Alice Vincent of The Daily Telegraph characterised as "a synth-laden, upbeat pop song", while Andy Kellman of AllMusic described it as "a sleek slice of retro-modern disco-funk".

Critical reception
The song received critical acclaim. Brennan Carley of Spin called it "pop perfection", "a thoroughly definitive, all-in jam" and predicted the song would "reach 'Uptown Funk' levels of airplay and ubiquity". Time Esther Zuckerman deemed the song a "New Favorite Contender for Song of the Summer" and wrote that the chorus was "infectious". In June 2015, Jason Lipshutz of Billboard named it  one of the "10 Best Songs of 2015 (So Far)".

Consequence of Sound compared the sound of the song to Michael Jackson. Complex wrote: "The song has a classic pop feel to it, with The Weeknd channeling a bit of Michael Jackson while crooning over the bouncy, and energetic production from Max Martin". Pitchforks reviewer Renato Pagnani placed it in the Best New Track category and made the same comparison: "Perhaps recognizing just how dead-on Tesfaye's Michael Jackson impersonation was on his cover of "Dirty Diana", the producers anchor the track with a bassline that could have come from an alternate-dimension "Thriller" produced by New Age composer Vangelis instead of Quincy Jones.

Rolling Stone ranked "Can't Feel My Face" at number one on its year-end list to find the 50 best songs of 2015. Billboard also picked "Can't Feel My Face" as the best song of 2015 on its year-end critics' picks: The Weeknd's irresistible, Michael Jackson-esque "Can't Feel My Face" is so perfectly crafted that it's impossible to imagine a world or alternative reality in which this song isn't number one. There are enough hooks in this one single for a dozen chart-toppers, but Abel Tesfaye [The Weeknd's real name] packed them all into three-and-a-half minutes of sheer ecstasy—and, naturally, topped the Hot 100 for the first time. Village Voice named "Can't Feel My Face" the third-best single released in 2015 on their annual year-end critics' poll, Pazz & Jop.

Chart performance
"Can't Feel My Face" debuted at number 24 on the US Billboard Hot 100, making a Hot Shot Debut on the chart; it was the Weeknd's third Hot Shot Debut in a year after his previous singles "The Hills" and "Earned It". It produced first-week digital sales of 93,000 units and garnered 4.2 million US streams and 38 million airplay audiences. In its third week on the chart, the song reached number six on the Hot 100, making it his third top 10 hit, and his second solo top 10 hit. After three weeks at number two, "Can't Feel My Face" ascended to number one on the Hot 100, replacing OMIs "Cheerleader" and becoming the Weeknd's first number-one single on that chart. It spent three non-consecutive weeks in three separate runs at the top of the Billboard Hot 100, becoming the sixth song to achieve this feat, and the first song to do so since Bruno Marss "Grenade" in 2011. In its third week at number one, "The Hills" reached number two, becoming the first act since The Black Eyed Peas to attain the top two positions on the Hot 100 as a lead artist. The following week, "The Hills" topped the chart, making the Weeknd the first artist since Taylor Swift to replace themselves at the top spot; "Can't Feel My Face" fell to number three. It spent nineteen weeks in the chart's top ten before dropping out on November 21, 2015.
As of March 2016, it has sold 2,413,488 copies in the US.

It debuted in Australia on June 20 at number 27. It later peaked at number two on that chart. In New Zealand, the song debuted at number 12 on June 22 and spent four non-consecutive weeks at number two, before reaching number one in its ninth week on the chart. In the United Kingdom, "Can't Feel My Face" debuted at number 34, two weeks after "The Hills" had debuted on the chart. It later peaked at number three, becoming the Weeknd's second top 10 single in the country (after "Earned It" peaked at number four earlier in the year), and was also his highest-charting single in the country at the time.

Music videos
The accompanying music video, directed by Grant Singer, was released on July 29, 2015, on Apple Music. It begins with the Weeknd singing in a bar to an unimpressed audience, with the exception of his love interest (played by Chanel Iman), until a man (played by Rick Wilder, who appeared in "The Hills" video), arrives and sets him on fire. The entire crowd, including the love interest, then stand up and starts to dance. The video ends with the Weeknd running out of the bar, still burning.

Time reviewer Nolan Feeney wrote that the Weeknd "shines the spotlight on Tesfaye as he delivers a (literally) explosive performance". For Bianca Gracie of Idolator, "the usually-moody singer is refreshingly energetic". Jon Blistein of Rolling Stone deemed the video "simple but riveting". Slava Pastuk of Noisey called the video "a bit corny, but weirdly great?" USA Today Brian Mansfield wrote: "Like his previous video for The Hills, it's sometimes troubling clip, full of fire and mayhem". Jason Lipshutz of Billboard opined that the video is "certainly a sonic homage to MJ, and watching the Weeknd strut around ablaze is an eery [sic] coincidence". Similarly, Michelle Geslani of Consequence of Sound wrote: "Abel Tesfaye is seen busting a couple of moves—no doubt, again, channeling Michael Jackson". Eric Diep of BET also described the video as an "homage to Michael Jackson", noting similarities in the vocals and dance moves.

An alternate music video was released on September 2, 2021.

Live performances
The Weeknd performed "Can't Feel My Face" live for the first time at Apple WWDC 2015, the day before its digital release. On July 10, Taylor Swift invited the Weeknd on stage for her 1989 World Tour in East Rutherford at the MetLife Stadium. The song was performed live on television for the first time at the 2015 MTV Video Music Awards. The Weeknd also sang it during Victoria's Secret Fashion Show, which aired on December 8, 2015.

The Weeknd also performed a part of the song at the Super Bowl LV halftime show.

Martin Garrix remix
On November 6, 2015, Martin Garrix released a remix of the song through XO lasting 4 minutes and 12 seconds. The remix was featured on the Japanese edition of Beauty Behind the Madness.

In popular culture
On July 27, 2015, actor Tom Cruise performed to "Can't Feel My Face" in a "Lip Sync Battle" on The Tonight Show Starring Jimmy Fallon.
The song is also featured in the 2015 video game Madden NFL 16.
Singer Stevie Wonder performed a parody of the song during a surprise pop-up concert at Central Park's SummerStage in New York City, August 17, 2015.
NASCAR driver David Ragan posted a video lip syncing the song to his No. 55 Toyota in response to a commonly asked question "What is it like driving a NASCAR Sprint Cup car?"
On September 7, 2015, popular YouTube channel Barack's Dubs uploaded a mashup video of former U.S. President Barack Obama singing the song.
The song has also been named 2015's US Song of the Summer by Spotify.
The song was featured in the 2015 YouTube Rewind as part of the video's soundtrack.
On September 15, 2015, during a game of "The Wheel Of Musical Impersonations" on The Tonight Show starring Jimmy Fallon, Jimmy Fallon sang "Can't Feel My Face" in the style of Sting, and Ariana Grande sang it in the style of Céline Dion.
The song also appeared in a season 2 episode of hit soap opera Empire called "Be True", aired on October 21, 2015.
Jay McGuiness and Aliona Vilani danced their showdance to "Can't Feel My Face" in the 2015 Strictly Come Dancing finale on December 19, 2015.
The song is also featured in other television shows including Being Mary Jane, Cooper Barrett's Guide to Surviving Life, Younger, Superstore, and The Real O'Neals.
The song is also featured in the rhythm game Just Dance 2017.
On the October 22, 2019, episode of reality television singing competition show The Voice, Team Gwen (Stefani) members Jessie Lawrence and Rose Short performed an arrangement of the song in a Battle round.
A cover of the song is played in the 2021 animated film Sing 2 by Kiana Ledé.

Track listing

Charts

Weekly charts

Year-end charts

Decade-end charts

All-time charts

Certifications

References

2015 songs
2015 singles
The Weeknd songs
Disco songs
Funk songs
Songs written by the Weeknd
Songs written by Max Martin
Songs written by Savan Kotecha
Songs written by Peter Svensson
Song recordings produced by Max Martin
Billboard Hot 100 number-one singles
Canadian Hot 100 number-one singles
Number-one singles in Denmark
Number-one singles in Iceland
Number-one singles in Israel
Number-one singles in New Zealand
Irish Singles Chart number-one singles
South African Airplay Chart number-one singles
Songs about cocaine
Songs written by Ali Payami
Republic Records singles
XO (record label) singles
Juno Award for Single of the Year singles